= IP1867B =

IP1867B is a potential brain cancer treatment under development by Innovate Pharmaceuticals for use in the treatment of brain tumors, by combining reformulated aspirin with two additional ingredients, into a soluble form. Developing a true liquid aspirin has long been a scientific goal. This new formulation significantly increases the ability of drugs to cross the blood brain barrier, which serves to protect the brain but also blocks many conventional cancer drugs from reaching brain tumors.

This research suggests that Innovate Pharmaceutical's IP1867B could be highly effective against glioblastoma (GBM), one of the most aggressive forms of the disease, which kills thousands of patients within a year.

As of June 2016 it has only been tested 'in-vitro' on adult and pediatric cancer and nerve cells. Clinical trials are not yet scheduled.
